Orchestral Works is an album by American pianist, composer and bandleader Duke Ellington with the Cincinnati Symphony Orchestra conducted by Erich Kunzel recorded and released on the Decca label in 1970.

Reception

The Allmusic review by Scott Yanow awarded the album 2 stars and states "fine but one misses his [Ellington's] illustrious orchestra. Interesting but not essential music".

Track listing
All compositions by Duke Ellington
 Poetic Commentary "A" - 1:43  
 "New World A-Comin'" - 11:20  
 Poetic Commentary "B" - 2:36  
 "Harlem/The Golden Broom and The Green Apple" - 14:14  
 Poetic Commentary "C" - 1:32  
 "Stanza 1: The Golden Broom" - 10:18  
 Poetic Commentary "D" - 1:20  
 "Stanza 2: The Green Apple" - 4:30  
 Poetic Commentary "E" - 1:32  
 "Stanza 3: The Handsome Traffic Policeman" - 5:57
Recorded May 28, 1970 in Cincinnati, Ohio.

Personnel
Duke Ellington – piano
The Cincinnati Symphony Orchestra, Erich Kunzel - conductor

References

Decca Records albums
Duke Ellington albums
1970 albums
Orchestral music